Columbus Kamba Simango (1890-1966), often known as Kamba Simango, was an ethnographer, missionary, musician, performer and activist of Vandau ethnicity.

Biography 
Simango was born in 1890 in Machanga District, Mozambique of Vandau ethnicity. He went to a Mission school.

In 1914, he went to the United States to study at the Hampton Institute, under the auspices of the American Board of Missions. After this he went to the Teachers College at Columbia University, until 1923. During this time, in April 1922, he participated as a dancer in the play Taboo, presented at the Sam H. Harris Theater in Harlem. The lead in Taboo was Paul Robeson (1898–1976), who was a friend of Simango. While in New York he met the anthropologist Franz Boas who encouraged him to become a native ethnographer. They corresponded for years. While in New York at the time of the Harlem Renaissance, he  also become friends with Pan-Africanist W. E. B. Du Bois. As a Vandau intellectual, he collaborated also with many anthropologists and Africanists, such as Melville Herskovits, Henri-Philippe Junod and Dora Earthy. 

He was married first to Kathleen Mary Easmon Simango on 1 June 1922. They had met in New York. After she died unexpectedly from appendicitis in 1924, he married Christine Cousey (in September 1925), with whom he had three children. They were in Mozambique from 1926 to 1937 and then Ghana where Simango died in an hit and run accident in 1966.

Notable achievements

In November 1923, Simango participated in the Third Pan-African Congress, organized in London.

In 1934–1935 he helped found the Mozambican organization Grémio Negrófilo de Manica e Sofala. The Grémio lasted until 1954 (under the name of Núcleo Negrófilo.)  It was outlawed for connections to an anticolonial uprising in the Machanga and Mambone regions.

Publications
Curtis, Natalie, Kamba Simango, and Madikane Cele, 1920. Songs and Tales from the Dark Continent, recorded from the singing and the sayings of C. Kamba Simango and Madikane Cele, New York, Boston, G. Schirmer.

« Tales and Proverbs of the Vandau of Portuguese South Africa » , Franz Boas & Kamba Simango, 1922

Bibliography
 Macagno, Lorenzo. 2022 "From Mozambique to New York : The Cosmopolitan Pathways of Kamba Simango, African Disciple of Franz Boas
 Morier-Genoud, Eric. 2011. “Columbus Kamba Simango.” in : H. L. Gates, Jr. and Emmanuel Akyeampong (eds.) Dictionary of African Biography, Oxford : Oxford University Press.

References

Further reading
Andrade, Mário Pinto de. 1989. “Protonacionalismo em Moçambique. Um estudo de caso : Kamba Simango (c.1890-1967)”, Arquivo. Boletim do Arquivo Histórico de Moçambique, Maputo, 6 :127-148.

Curtis, Natalie “ From Kraal to College. The story of Kamba Simango”  The Outlook 1921, September, 129(2)

Rennie, John Keith. 1973. Christianity, Colonialism and the Origins of Nationalism among the Ndau of Southern Rhodesia, 1890-1935. 1973. PhD unpublished thesis, Northwestern University, Evanston, Illinois

Spencer, Leon P. 2013. Toward an African Church in Mozambique. Kamba Simango and the Protestant Community in Manica and Sofala, 1892-1945. Lilongwe : Mzuni Press.

1890 births
1966 deaths
Mozambican people
20th-century anthropologists
Anthropologists